Ala-Malmi (Finnish), Nedre Malm (Swedish) is a northern-central neighborhood of Helsinki, Finland.

About five and half thousand people live in Ala-Malmi. In 2003, the area provided jobs for 4345 people. The services of the area include Malmitalo cultural center and library, an indoor swimming pool, social services department office, several nurseries, schools and vocational schools, such as Haaga-Helia University of Applied Sciences.

In the southern part of the area, near Ring I, is the Malmi cemetery which was founded in 1890.

See also
 Ylä-Malmi

References

Neighbourhoods of Helsinki